Diatome (13 June 1962 – 8 October 1985) was a British-bred Thoroughbred racehorse.

Background
Diatome was owned and bred by the French banker, Baron Guy de Rothschild and was a descendant of Prince Palatine,

Racing career
Diatome won important races in France but had the bad luck of being foaled the same year as superstars Sea-Bird and Reliance. He finished second to Reliance in the Prix du Jockey Club and the Grand Prix de Paris. In the Prix de l'Arc de Triomphe, Diatome finished third behind Reliance and winner Sea Bird. However, he earned a prestigious victory in the United States in the 1965 Washington, D.C. International at the Laurel Park Racecourse in Laurel, Maryland.

Stud record
Diatome was retired to stud in 1967 at his owner's Haras de Meautry and in 1975 was sent to a breeding farm in Japan. He died on 8 October 1985.

References
 Diatome's pedigree and stats

1962 racehorse births
1985 racehorse deaths
Racehorses bred in the United Kingdom
Racehorses trained in France
Thoroughbred family 12-e